Pitcher sage is a common name for several plants and may refer to:

Lepechinia
Salvia spathacea, native to southern and central California